A123 Hymotion is a subsidiary company of A123Systems.

History
It was founded in 2005 in Toronto, Ontario, Canada, as Hymotion. It introduced plug-in hybrid electric vehicle (PHEV) upgrade kits in February 2006. In February 2007, Hymotion was acquired by A123Systems, the manufacturer of the batteries that Hymotion uses for upgrades.

Products
Designed for the Toyota Prius and the Ford Escape and Mariner Hybrids, these kits can be purchased by individuals for the Prius and professionally installed by 17 different certified companies in Canada and the United States.

Awards and citations
The South Coast Air Quality Management District awarded Hymotion to convert 10 Toyota Prius hybrid vehicles to PHEVs.

See also 
 Aftermarket kit

References 

Hybrid vehicles
Plug-in hybrid vehicle industry
Electric vehicle conversion